The ATE Vulture is a South African unmanned aerial vehicle (UAV) designed and built by Advanced Technologies and Engineering (now Paramount Advanced Technologies, a division of the Paramount Group). It is powered by a 500 cc 2-stroke fuel injected engine.  Its payload is a gyro stabilised optronic sight communicating on a secure C-Band data/video link. Its cruise speed is 120 km/h and its flight duration allows a loiter time of about 4 hours at 60 km from the launch site with a maximum ceiling of 5,000 m. It is fully automated in launch, flight and recovery, with an automatic return-to-base in case of mission critical failures. An automated vacuum type catapult launcher is mounted on a Samil 100 truck. No external pilot is required, and the transition from launch mode into pre-programmed flight mode is automatic. It is used by the South African Army artillery for target acquisition and fire control.

Notes

External links
 Manufacturers website

Unmanned military aircraft of South Africa